Bill Whisler (born November 15, 1940) was a Canadian football player who played for the Winnipeg Blue Bombers, BC Lions and Montreal Alouettes. He won the Grey Cup with them in 1962. He played college football at the University of Iowa. Whisler was drafted in the 1961 NFL draft by the Washington Redskins in Round 9 and was a late cut from the 1962 team. He is a member of the South Dakota Sports Hall of Fame and Winnipeg Blue Bombers Hall of Fame.

References

1940 births
People from Yankton, South Dakota
Winnipeg Blue Bombers players
Living people
Iowa Hawkeyes football players
BC Lions players
Montreal Alouettes players
American football defensive linemen
Canadian football defensive linemen
Players of American football from South Dakota